North Dallas Adventist Academy (NDAA) is a Christian Adventist K-12 school in Richardson, Texas. It was founded as the Richardson Adventist School (RAS). The school in its current form opened in August 2008.

References

External links
 North Dallas Adventist Academy

High schools in Richardson, Texas
Christian schools in Texas
High schools in Dallas County, Texas
Private K-12 schools in Texas
Adventist secondary schools in the United States